Kasba Thermal Power Station is a gas-based thermal power plant located at Kasba in Kolkata in the Indian state of West Bengal. The power plant is operated by CESC Limited.

Capacity
It has an installed capacity of 40 MW (2x20 MW gas turbines).

References

Natural gas-fired power stations in West Bengal
Power stations in Kolkata
Year of establishment missing